Giuseppe Ceracchi (also known as Giuseppe Cirachi) (4 July 1751 – 30 January 1801) was an Italian sculptor, active in a Neoclassic style in Italy, England and the nascent United States, who was a passionate republican during the American and French revolutions. He is remembered for his portrait busts of prominent British and American individuals.

Early years
He initially trained in Rome with Tommaso Righi (1727–1802) and then continued his studies at the Accademia di San Luca. He went to London in 1773, armed with a letter of introduction from Matthew Nulty, an English antiquarian and amateur sculptor in Rome, and worked under Agostino Carlini, a founding member of the Royal Academy. Ceracchi exhibited busts at the Academy 1776-79 and was proposed for membership but received only four votes. His bust of the Academy's president Sir Joshua Reynolds, is in the collection of the Royal Academy of Art. Living in Carlini's lodgings near Soho Square, Ceracchi modelled architectural ornament and bas-relief panels for Robert Adam, most notably a grand bas-relief of a Sacrifice to Bacchus, fourteen feet long and six feet high, in Adam's patent mastic composition, for the rear façade of Mr. Desenfans' house in Portland Place. 

In 1778, Ceracchi sculpted the statues of Temperance and Fortitude cast in Portland stone for the Strand façade of Sir William Chambers' Somerset House, London; Carlini, who modelled the other two classical virtues for the project, was occupied with architectural sculpture for Somerset House over several years and doubtless recommended Ceracchi. As well as the portrait busts he executed in London is a full-length portrait of Anne Seymour Damer, herself a sculptor and to some extent his pupil, in antique robes, with her tools at her feet (British Museum).

He went back to Rome in 1781 but had to leave the city twice due to his links with the Jacobin movements. He befriended Johann Wolfgang von Goethe during the German poet's Grand Tour in Italy in 1786 - 1788, as they dwelled in the same building in Via del Corso where Ceracchi had his atelier/house. Goethe commissioned him a bust of Johann Joachim Winckelmann and they lived together in Ceracchi's studio for a brief period in 1788.

Work in America
He made two visits to the new American republic, in 1790–2, in hopes of being commissioned to erect an extremely elaborate monument to the new republic and George Washington that he was convinced Congress had voted, and again in 1794–5, when he was disappointed in raising the funds for his venture by private subscription. Of this unrealizable project for a bombastic marble allegory James Madison drily remarked that the sculptor "was an enthusiastic worshipper of Liberty and Fame, and his whole soul was bent on securing the latter by rearing a monument to the former". Duplicate letters from Ceracchi to Washington and George Clinton describe plans for a national monument to Washington to be built in the newly planned capital city.

During his two American visits he executed heroic portrait busts of leaders of the American Revolution, including Benjamin Franklin (Pennsylvania Academy of Fine Arts), John Jay (Supreme Court, Washington DC), Thomas Jefferson (Monticello), George Washington with a Roman haircut and a toga (Metropolitan Museum of Art, George Clinton, again presented as a noble Roman (twice, Boston Atheneum and New-York Historical Society), and Alexander Hamilton. Most of his prominent subjects sat to him to encourage his art, but none could be found to pay for their busts after the fact. Washington politely refused the gift of his Roman bust.
At the request of artist Charles Willson Peale, Ceracchi was invited along with 30 artists to the Museum rooms at Philosophical Hall in Philadelphia on December 29, 1794 where he signed an agreement to create "The Columbianum, or American Academy of the Fine Arts." This short lived organization was a precursor of the modern day Pennsylvania Academy of Fine Arts created in 1805.

Work in Italy and France
He returned to Florence about 1794. In Rome he entered with fiery vehemence into the projected Italian Republic under revolutionary French auspices, when Joseph Bonaparte arrived in the city in 1797, drawing Jacobin sympathizers to him. In the Jacobin riots of December 1797, during which brigadier-general Mathurin-Léonard Duphot was killed, Ceracchi was noted as a leader of the rioters; events led directly from Duphot's death to the Directoire's decision to occupy the city. French troops arrived on 10 February 1798 and on the 15th the Republic of Rome was proclaimed. In 1799 Ceracchi moved to Paris, where he sculpted the portrait bust of Pope Pius VI (Residenzmuseum, Munich; Palazzo Bianco, Genoa). Having sculpted a bust of Napoleon Bonaparte (Museum at Nantes), he became disillusioned after the coup d'état of 18 Brumaire to the extent that he was embroiled in the paranoid and furious reaction of Napoleon to the plot of the Rue Saint-Nicaise, an attempt against Napoleon's life in which a device dubbed the machine infernal was exploded, with loss of innocent life. Ceracchi was arrested for his alleged participation in the "Conspiration des poignards" and guillotined 30 January 1801, "going to the scaffold, it is said, in a triumphal chariot of his own design".

Gallery

See also
Alexander Hamilton (Ceracchi)
George Washington (Ceracchi)
Conspiration des poignards

References

Bibliography

External links 

Art and the empire city: New York, 1825-1861, an exhibition catalog from The Metropolitan Museum of Art (fully available online as PDF), which contains material on Ceracchi (see index)

 
1751 births
1801 deaths
Artists from Rome
18th-century Italian sculptors
Italian male sculptors
People executed by France by decapitation
Executed Italian people
People executed by the First French Empire